is a Shinto shrine located in the city of Hakui, Ishikawa Prefecture, Japan. It was the former ichinomiya of Noto Province. The main kami enshrined is Ōkuninushi. The shrine's main festival is held annually on April 3.

History
The original construction of this shrine is unknown, but it is said to have been constructed on the location where Ōkuninushi landed with 300 of his folders from Izumo to subdue the inhabitants of Noto Peninsula during the reign of the demi-legendary 8th Emperor Kōgen or 10th Emperor Sujin.  The shrine is first mentioned in history in a poem in the Man'yōshū by Otomo no Yakamochi dated 748 AD. It is also mentioned in the 768 AD Shoku Nihongi, and by the 859 AD Nihon Sandai Jitsuroku, it had been accorded 1st Court Rank.

The shrine was patronised by the Maeda clan during the Edo period and a number of its structures date from this time. Under the pre-World War II  Modern system of ranked Shinto Shrines, the shrine was classified as a national shrine of the first rank (国幣大社, kokuhei taisha).

Five of the shrine's structures have been designated Important Cultural Properties:
 Haiden, built in 1787
 Heiden, built in 1653
 Gate, built in 1583
 sub-shrine Hakusan Jinja Haiden
 sub-shrine Wakamiya Jinja Haiden

See also
Keta Wakamiya Shrine
List of Shinto shrines

External links
Official website

Shinto shrines in Ishikawa Prefecture
Important Cultural Properties of Japan
Noto Province
Hakui, Ishikawa